Oli Denton (born 8 June 1990) is a professional rugby union player for Leeds Carnegie. Denton was educated at St Peter's School, York and has plenty experience of playing rugby sevens.

References

External links

1990 births
Living people
English rugby union players
Leeds Tykes players
People educated at St Peter's School, York
Rugby union players from York
Rugby union wings